The 2020–21 EFL Championship (referred to as the Sky Bet Championship for sponsorship reasons) was the 17th season of the  Football League Championship under its current title and the 29th season under its current league division format.

Team changes 
The following teams have changed division since the 2019–20 season:

To Championship 
Promoted from League One
 Coventry City
 Rotherham United
 Wycombe Wanderers

Relegated from the Premier League
 Bournemouth
 Watford
 Norwich City

From Championship 
Promoted to the Premier League
 Leeds United
 West Bromwich Albion
 Fulham
Relegated to League One
 Charlton Athletic
 Wigan Athletic
 Hull City

Stadiums

Attendances 
As with the end to the previous season, the season was affected by the COVID-19 pandemic, resulting in games being played behind closed doors. However, on 19 September 2020, two matches in the division, between Norwich City and Preston North End at Carrow Road, and between Middlesbrough and Bournemouth at The Riverside Stadium, were held in front of 1,000 spectators, as part of EFL pilots.

This was seen as the beginning of fans gradually returning, but a rapid rise of cases from the end of September (eventually resulting in a second nationwide lockdown in November), led to plans being put on hold.

With the second nationwide lockdown ending on 2 December 2020, it was announced England would return to its previous three tier system, with clubs in Tier 2 allowed to host a maximum of 2,000 spectators. The first of these matches took place on 2 December 2020 itself, although the matches of Luton Town and Wycombe Wanderers were capped at 1,000 spectators, as they had not previously held an EFL pilot event.

On Saturday 5 December 2020, Reading, Millwall, Watford, Norwich City and Brentford all hosted matches in front of the maximum allotted 2,000 spectators permitted, with fans in attendance at Brentford Community Stadium for the very first time.

However, it was then announced that from Wednesday 16 December 2020, that London, parts of Essex and parts of Hertfordshire, would move up to Tier 3, the highest tier of restrictions in England, meaning football clubs in these areas, (for The EFL Championship: Brentford, Millwall, Queens Park Rangers and Watford), would revert to playing behind closed doors without fans, due to a rise in coronavirus cases, following a tier review.

It was then announced that from Saturday, 19 December 2020 that Bedfordshire, Berkshire, and Buckinghamshire would also move into Tier 3, meaning for the EFL Championship that Luton Town, Reading & Wycombe Wanderers would also revert to playing behind closed doors without fans again, as of this date. Conversely, Bristol City, who had previously been unable to host fans, would now be able to allow fans back in, with Bristol being downgraded from Tier 3 to Tier 2. As of these updated restrictions, it now meant that only Bournemouth, Bristol City and Norwich City's stadiums would be open to host fans in The EFL Championship. This was reversed on Wednesday 23 December 2020, with Bournemouth the sole team in the division eligible to host fans. A week later on 30 December 2020, Tier 2 was removed in England, with mainland England in either Tiers 3 or 4, meaning once again, no clubs could host fans for the foreseeable future. A third national lockdown in January 2021 meant that fans ultimately were barred from matches for the rest of the regular season. Following an easing of restrictions in May 2021, the play-offs were able to take place in front of crowds of up to 20% of a stadium's capacity.

Personnel and sponsoring 

  Club captain Wayne Rooney retired from playing on 15 January 2021 to manage the club on a permanent basis, having served as interim player-manager since the previous November following the dismissal of Phillip Cocu.
  Nottingham Forest and Queens Park Rangers' shirt sponsor was Football Index until 12 March 2021 when they entered administration.

Managerial changes

League table

Play-offs 

First leg
 

Second leg

Final

Results

Season statistics

Scoring

Top scorers

 1 Includes 2 goals in The Championship play-offs.
 2 Includes 1 goal in The Championship play-offs.

Hat-tricks

Most assists

 1 Includes 1 assist in The Championship play-offs.

Clean sheets 

 1 Includes 1 clean sheet in The Championship play-offs.

Discipline

Players
 Most yellow cards: 12
  Nathaniel Chalobah (Watford)
  Michael Ihiekwe (Rotherham United)
  Jefferson Lerma1 (Bournemouth)
 Most red cards: 2
  Emiliano Buendía (Norwich City)
  Kyle McFadzean (Coventry City)
 1 Includes 1 yellow card in The Championship play-offs.

Club
 Most yellow cards: 80
 Rotherham United
 Watford
 Most red cards: 7
 Sheffield Wednesday

Awards

Monthly

Annual 

Championship Team of the season

PFA Championship Team of the Year

Notes and references 

EFL Championship seasons
Eng
1
2
2020–21 EFL Championship